is a railway station in the city of Tōkai, Aichi Prefecture,  Japan, operated by Meitetsu.

Lines

Station layout
The station has two opposed elevated side platforms with the station building underneath.  The station has automated ticket machines, Manaca automated turnstiles and is unattended.

Platforms

Adjacent stations

Station history
Takayokosuka Station was opened on April 1, 1932 as a station on the Chita Railway. The Chita Railway became part of the Meitetsu group on February 2, 1943. The station has been unattended since 1949. In July 2006, the Tranpass system of magnetic fare cards with automatic turnstiles was implemented.

Passenger statistics
In fiscal 2017, the station was used by an average of 3086passengers daily

Surrounding area
Yokosuka High School

See also
 List of Railway Stations in Japan

References

External links

  Official web page

Railway stations in Japan opened in 1931
Railway stations in Aichi Prefecture
Stations of Nagoya Railroad
Tōkai, Aichi